Toonsylvania is an American animated television series, which ran for two seasons in 1998 on the Fox Kids Network block (usually placed in a block called "The No Yell Motel" that contained other scary kids' shows such as Goosebumps and Eerie, Indiana) in its first season, then was moved to Monday afternoons from September 14, 1998 until January 18, 1999, when it was cancelled. It was executive produced in part by Steven Spielberg, as DreamWorks' first animated series.

The show had recurring cartoon series that appeared in each episode. (Unlike Animaniacs, Toonsylvania did not have a wide range of characters and almost every episode had the same content.) The main segments were "Frankenstein", "Night of the Living Fred" (most episodes on season one), "Attack of the Killer B Movies" (some episodes from season 1), "Igor's Science Minute", and "Melissa Screetch's Morbid Morals".

Plot summary 
A typical episode of Toonsylvania starts with a cartoon series called "Frankenstein" (a parody of Mary Shelley's novel of the same name), about the adventures of Dr. Vic Frankenstein (voiced by David Warner), his assistant Igor (voiced by Wayne Knight) who always sets out to prove that he is a genius like his master, and their dim-witted Frankenstein Monster known as Phil (voiced by Brad Garrett). Before the second cartoon, there is an animated vignette where Igor is on the couch with Phil and tries to fix the TV remote, but in every episode there is a new problem with it (a running gag akin to the couch gags seen on The Simpsons).

After that, there is a cartoon series called "Night of the Living Fred", about a family of zombies. This segment was created by cartoonist Mike Peters. Sometimes, a parody of a B-list horror movie would air instead of a "Night of the Living Fred" cartoon.

After that, there is a short segment called "Igor's Science Minute", where Igor gives a science lesson (be it a musical piece or a spoken piece) that always ends in disaster.

The final segment is "Melissa Screetch's Morbid Morals", where Phil the Frankenstein Monster does something bad and Igor punishes him by reading a horror tale involving a bratty girl named Melissa Screech (voiced by Nancy Cartwright) who does not heed the warnings of adults (usually given by her mother) and suffers the consequences for it one way or another.

Second season changes 
In season two, Bill Kopp and Jeff DeGrandis left the show and were replaced by Paul Rugg. The series' format changed into more of a sitcom style, with Igor, Dr. Vic Frankenstein and Phil interacting with a variety of new characters, including a snooping next-door neighbor Seth Tuber (voiced by Jonathan Harris), who was based on Norman Bates from Psycho. He interacted with his "immobile" mother by putting his hand over his mouth and talking into it. There was also a typical Transylvanian angry mob that was, in fact, a cheerful group of Beatles-esque hipsters. Most of these new characters were voiced by Paul Rugg, who also improvised many of their lines.

The only other backup segments to re-materialize in season two were the B-movie parodies (though some episodes of "Night of the Living Fred" aired) and Melissa Screetch in a new segment called "The Melissa Screech Show". Whenever Melissa was disappointed with a friend or a family member, she would go home and cover herself under her bed sheets where she pretended to host a show. She then had her transgressor on as a guest star and often did away with them in an ironic manner.

Series overview

Episodes

Season 1 (1998) 
Note: All episodes in this season were directed by Jeff DeGrandis.

Season 2 (1998–99)

Music 
The music for the series was written by Michael Tavera, Keith Baxter, Christopher Neal Nelson, John Paul Given, Christopher Klatman and Thom Sharp. The main title song was written by Steve Bernstein and Julie Bernstein with lyrics by Paul Rugg.

Cast 
 David Warner – Dr. Vic Frankenstein
 Wayne Knight – Igor, Igor's reflection
 Brad Garrett – Phil, Bunny Wunny (on "Melissa Screetch's Morbid Morals: Melissa Screetch: Earth Ambassador"), various
 Nancy Cartwright – Melissa Screetch ("Melissa Screetch's Morbid Morals" and "The Melissa Screetch Show" segments)
 Matt Frewer – Dedgar Deadman (season one)
 Jess Harnell – Dedgar Deadman (season two), Wink Dracula (on "Love Hurts"), Johnny Vermin (on "A Kiss Before Dying"), Igor's singing voice (on "Igor's Science Minute: The Periodic Table"), various
 Jonathan Harris – Seth Tuber (season two)
 Tom Kenny – Ace Deuce, various
 Valery Pappas – Stiffany Deadman ("Night of the Living Fred" segments), Melissa Screetch's mother ("Melissa Screetch's Morbid Morals" segments), various
 Paul Rugg – Seth Tuber's mom (season two)
 Kath Soucie – Ashley Deadman ("Night of the Living Fred" segments), Kyle Screetch ("Melissa Screetch's Morbid Morals" segments)
 Billy West – Fred Deadman ("Night of the Living Fred" segments), Hoboken, N.J. (from the "B-movie" parodies), Toy Store Clerk/Mall Clerk (on "Darla Doiley: Demon Doll" and "Spawn of Santa"), Dr. Earl Schwartzberg ("Built For Speed"), various

 Additional voices
 Charlie Adler – Customer (on "Darla Doiley: Demon Doll"), Dr. Vic's grandmother (on "WereGranny"), various
 Jocelyn Blue – Mama Bear, Gertrude (on "Family Plot")
 Corey Burton – Death (on the episode "Doom With a View"), Debbie the bank robber (on the episode "Spawn of Santa")
 Cam Clarke – Various
 Jim Cummings – Army general ("B-movie" segments), Santa Claus (on "Spawn of Santa"), Coach (on "Night of the Living Fred"), various
 Sandy Fox – Darla Doiley, Baby Bear, various
 Bill Kopp – various
 April Winchell – Liz (on "Love Hurts")

Crew 
 Bill Kopp – Executive Producer, Writer ("B-Movie"), Creator, Voice Director
 Jeff DeGrandis – Producer, Director
 Steven Spielberg – Executive Producer
 Keith Baxter – Writer ("The Inferior Decorator"; also credited for lyrics for musical episodes of "Igor's Science Minute" and co-credited with Christopher Neil Nelson for music in "Igor's Science Minute")
 Lee Mendelson – Creative Consultant ("Night of the Living Fred")
 Chris Otsuki – Creator ("Melissa Screetch"), Writer ("Igor's Science Minute" and "Melissa Screetch's Morbid Morals")
 Mike Peters –  Creator ("Night of the Living Fred"), Writer ("Night of the Living Fred": "Football...and Other Body Parts", "A Kiss Before Dying" [co-written with Tracy Peters], "A Zombie is Born" [co-written with Martin Olson], and "Mall for One and One For Mall" [co-written by Vinny Montello and Steve Ochs])

Home media releases 
On August 31, 1999, a VHS cassette of Toonsylvania was released, which contained selected episodes and was released with the season two opening (though all of the episodes were from season one). The episodes seen were "Darla Doiley, Demon Doll", "Voodoo Vacation", "Baby Human", "Dead Dog Day Afternoon", "Igor's Science Minute" ("Clone or Be Cloned", "The Brain", "Earthquake Boogie", and "Gravity and the Eiffel Tower"), "Melissa Screetch's Morbid Morals" ("The Boogeyman", "Stop Making Ugly Faces", "Here There Be Monsters", and "Melissa Screetch: Earth Ambassador"), "Phil's Brain", "Football...and Other Body Parts", "Bang!", and "WereGranny".

In 2014, Netflix's Brazilian and Latin American feed streamed the entire series. This is the most recent home media release of the show in any capacity. As of 2021, this series has not been released on DVD or Blu-ray, nor has it been released on any streaming service in the United States.

Video game 
A Toonsylvania video game was developed by RFX Interactive and released by Light & Shadow Production and Ubi Soft for the Game Boy Color in 2000.

Merchandise 
Toonsylvania action figures and playsets were developed by Pangea Corporation and released by Toy Island. Burger King distributed toys based on Toonsylvania in their kids' meals for a short period of time.

See also 
The Hilarious House of Frightenstein

References

External links 
 
 Toonsylvania cartoon list at the Big Cartoon DataBase

1990s American animated television series
1990s American anthology television series
1998 American television series debuts
1999 American television series endings
American children's animated anthology television series
American children's animated comedy television series
American children's animated fantasy television series
American children's animated horror television series
Television series by DreamWorks Animation
Television series by DreamWorks Television
Fox Kids
Fox Broadcasting Company original programming